The David Game College Group is an independent college group in the UK.  It was established in 1974.

The group has its roots in a tutorial college in the 1970s. David Game College was first accredited by the British Accreditation Council in 1993.

The various Colleges that make up the group are located at various sites across London, specifically Tower Hill, as well as several colleges outside London and outside the U.K.

Locations
The David Game College Group consists of the following colleges:

London 

 Albemarle College
 David Game College
 Kensington Academy of English
 London Film Academy, (LFA)
 London School of Dramatic Art, (LSDA)
 London School of Publishing
 London School of Public Relations
 Westminster Tutors
 City Tutors

Outside London 

 Bath Academy, Bath 
 Oxford Language Centre

Overseas 

 Westminster Colleges, Pakistan 
Westminster School and College Islamabad

References

External links
 

Universities and colleges in the United Kingdom